Newlyn Society of Artists, often abbreviated to NSA, is an artists association founded in 1896. It is based in Newlyn, Cornwall. It was founded by a group of local artists to organise exhibitions at the new Newlyn Art Gallery built by John Passmore Edwards, its members went on to be known as the 'Newlyn School'. It currently has between 85 - 140 members, who are professional artists who either live in, or have strong connections with the South West. According to their website, the membership is composed of artists working in contemporary media such as painting, sculpture, photography, printmaking, video/digital, site specific and performance art.

The society currently exhibits work at Tremenheere art gallery, among others.

Notable members

Wilhelmina Barns-Graham
Lamorna Birch
Stanhope Forbes
Terry Frost
Norman Garstin
Patrick Heron
Laura Knight
Walter Langley
Peter Lanyon
Bernard Leach
Alfred Munnings
Dod Proctor
John Wells

References

Organisations based in Cornwall
Arts organisations based in England